Sacca Sessola loosely translated as "Bailing-Scoop Cove" (also called "Isola delle Rose" or "Island of Roses" by the hotel which is located in on the island, it is not a name recognized by the Venetians, or on topographical maps) is an island in the Venetian Lagoon, northern Italy.

One of the biggest in the lagoon (16.03 ha) and also one of the youngest. It was artificially created in 1870 in Codas of Reziol, a branch of the Channel Rezzo, with materials from the construction of the Santa Marta commercial port, and has been used a fuel dump, hospital, farming land, UNESCO research complex. The entire island now houses the JW Marriott Venice Resort and Spa

A "sacca" or "bag" is an artificial island (see also Sacca Fisola and Sacca San Biagio).

History
Taken from the Italian version of this article
1860-1870 - The island was artificially created with land-depth reporting from the channels of the maritime station and owned by Royal Administration.
1875 - The island was given to the city of Venice with an agreement and used for fuel storage.
1892 - Decommissioned from fuel storage.  Conversion for use as a hospital for contagious diseases was begun.
1904 - Some buildings are restored and converted for hospital use.
1909 - Works are completed.
1913 - Following the end of the cholera epidemic of 1911, hospital buildings were constructed in Romanesque style.
1914 - St. Mark's Hospital for the treatment of tuberculosis was inaugurated. During the First World War the sanatorium remained closed.
1920 - Sanitorium reopened
1921 - The church was built in neo-Romanesque style.
1923 - A leisure pavilion was built.
1927 - The City of Venice gave the island a government agency (the future INPS ) for the building of a new hospital with 300 beds.
1931 - Work began on the construction of a new building.
1936 - The Pulmonary Hospital, "Achille De Giovanni" was inaugurated by King Vittorio Emanuele III including pavilions, a park, thermal power station, stores, workshops, recreational club with cinema and a water tower.
1979 - The Hospital ceases its activity and begins a slow process of abandonment and decay.
1981 - The island property is transferred to the Municipality.
1992 - The City Council entrusts the island to the UNESCO International Center for Marine Sciences and Technology.
2000 - The island was sold to a multi-national company and has been converted into a private tourist hotel complex not advertised openly on the internet.
March 2015 - JW Marriott Venice Resort and Spa opens.

References

Islands of the Venetian Lagoon